Blatné is a lake in Slovakia.

References

Lakes of Slovakia